Ashwin Gumaste is an Indian computer engineer and institute chair professor at the department of computer science and engineering of the Indian Institute of Technology, Bombay. He is known for his work on Carrier Ethernet Switch routers—the largest technology transfer  between any IIT and industry.

Ashwin Gumaste, was previously with Fujitsu Laboratories of America in Richardson Tx, USA, as a member of research staff (2001–05), and held positions at Fujitsu Network Communications and Cisco Systems. Prior to his current appointment Gumaste has also served as the James R. Isaac Chair Assistant professor at IITB before holding the institute chair associate professorship of the institution. He also held positions as a visiting scientist at Massachusetts Institute of Technology at their research laboratory for electronics (Claude-E-Shannon group). Ashwin Gumaste holds 25 US patents.

Ashwin Gumaste has published 175 peer-reviewed research articles in journals and conference proceedings, He has also published three books, viz. DWDM Network Designs and Engineering Solutions, First Mile Access Networks and Enabling Technologies and Broadband services : business models and technologies for community networks.

Ashwin Gumaste, is a recipient of the Swaranajayanti fellowship  of the Department of Science and Technology, and has received honors such as DAE-SRC Outstanding Research Investigator Award (2010), the Young Engineer Award of the Indian National Academy of Engineering (2010), the Vikram Sarabhai Research Award (2012) and the IBM Faculty Award (2012).

The Council of Scientific and Industrial Research, the apex agency of the Government of India for scientific research, awarded him the Shanti Swarup Bhatnagar Prize for Science and Technology, one of the highest Indian science awards, for his contributions to engineering sciences in 2018.

Developed products and technologies 
The Carrier Ethernet Switch Router (CESR) developed by Gumaste and his team were transferred to PSU ECIL. The CESRs are a family of three products - a table-top switch with 4x1G and 8FE ports, a metro edge device with data-center capability, and a core router with 96Gbit/s cross-connect capability. One of the salient features of the CESRs was a 1-microsecond port-to-port latency across layer 0–3. The CESRs were also developed as a carrier-class technology. The CESRs have been widely deployed, such as in service providers  and data-centers. In the year 2018, Gumaste and his team developed a terabit SDN router in collaboration with ANURAG DRDO.

Selected bibliography

Books

Articles

See also 

Access network
Broadband
Telecommunications
Software Defined Networking

References

External links 
 
 
 

Recipients of the Shanti Swarup Bhatnagar Award in Engineering Science
Indian scientific authors
Year of birth missing (living people)
Academic staff of IIT Bombay
21st-century Indian inventors
Indian electronics engineers
Massachusetts Institute of Technology people
Fujitsu people
Living people